Jenna Bruton (born 8 November 1995) is an Australian rules footballer playing with  in the AFL Women's (AFLW) competition.

Early life
Bruton grew up in Trentham and began working full-time on her family's potato farm as a teenager. She started playing football at age seven and represented Victoria as a junior, with a career in the sport gaining traction during 2013 by playing in the first women's AFL exhibition match.

In 2016, Bruton chose not to nominate for the inaugural AFLW draft, citing a need to spend more time with her mother who had recently been diagnosed with brain cancer. Her passion for the game was reignited in 2017, and she was selected in the VFL Women's Team of the Year while also winning the club best and fairest award for the St Kilda Sharks.

Bruton's submission for the following AFLW draft was solicited by partner and fellow footballer Jasmine Garner.

AFL Women's career
After making her debut in a 26-point win against  at VU Whitten Oval in the opening round of the 2018 season, she would go on to be a member of the Bulldogs' premiership team when they defeated  in the grand final.

In May 2018, Bruton signed with expansion team North Melbourne for the 2019 AFLW season. She enjoyed a breakout year, moving from a pressure forward position to a permanent midfield role, consequently earning selection in the All-Australian squad and winning the club's inaugural best and fairest award.

Bruton re-signed with North Melbourne in April 2019, committing to the club until the end of the 2021 season. She re-signed again with the club in June 2021 for a further two seasons.

Statistics
 Statistics are correct to the end of the 2021 season

|- style="background-color:#EAEAEA"
! scope="row" style="text-align:center" | 2018
|
| 35 || 8 || 3 || 2 || 52 || 39 || 91 || 21 || 37 || 0.4 || 0.3 || 6.5 || 4.9 || 11.4 || 2.6 || 4.5 || 0
|-
| scope="row" style="text-align:center" | 2019
|
| 35 || 7 || 0 || 0 || 81 || 46 || 127 || 18 || 37 || 0.0 || 0.0 || 11.6 || 6.6 || 18.1 || 2.6 || 5.3 || 6
|- style="background-color:#EAEAEA"
| scope="row" style="text-align:center" | 2020
|
| 35 || 7 || 0 || 0 || 68 || 54 || 122 || 15 || 40 || 0.0 || 0.0 || 9.7 || 7.7 || 17.4 || 2.1 || 5.7 || 10
|-
| scope="row" style="text-align:center" | 2021
|
| 35 || 9 || 0 || 0 || 89 || 74 || 163 || 32 || 32 || 0.0 || 0.0 || 9.9 || 8.2 || 18.1 || 3.6 || 3.6 || 8
|- class="sortbottom"
! colspan=3| Career
! 31 || 3 || 2 || 290 || 213 || 503 || 86 || 146 || 0.1 || 0.1 || 9.4 || 6.9 || 16.2 || 2.8 || 4.7 || 24
|}

References

External links 

1995 births
Living people
Western Bulldogs (AFLW) players
Australian rules footballers from Victoria (Australia)
North Melbourne Football Club (AFLW) players